This is a list of 104 species in the springtail genus Ceratophysella.

Ceratophysella species

References

Ceratophysella
Ceratophysella